Pitch is an American drama television series created by Dan Fogelman and Rick Singer, that aired on Fox from September 22 to December 8, 2016. The series was commissioned on May 10, 2016.

On May 1, 2017, Fox canceled the series after one season.

Plot
The series, set in the confines of Major League Baseball, sets its focus on a young pitcher noted for her screwball pitch who becomes the first woman to play in the Major Leagues when she is called up by the San Diego Padres.

Cast

Main
 Kylie Bunbury as Genevieve "Ginny" Baker, a rookie pitcher and the first woman to play in Major League Baseball
 Mark-Paul Gosselaar as Michael "Mike" Lawson, the Padres' captain and veteran catcher who is nearing the end of a Hall of Fame career
 Mark Consuelos as Oscar Arguella, the Padres' general manager
 Mo McRae as Blip Sanders, a Padres outfielder who is a friend and former minor league teammate of Ginny's
 Meagan Holder as Evelyn Sanders, Blip's wife and Ginny's friend
 Tim Jo as Eliot, Ginny's social media manager
 Dan Lauria as Al Luongo, the Padres' manager
 Ali Larter as Amelia Slater, Ginny's agent

Recurring
 Michael Beach as William "Bill" Baker, Ginny's father
 B. J. Britt as Will Baker, Ginny's older brother who is eager to capitalize on her fame and start his own sports bar
 Bob Balaban as Franklin "Frank" Reid, the Padres' owner
 Kelly Jenrette as Rhonda, Oscar's assistant
 Kevin Connolly as Charlie Graham, the Padres' interim president of operations who is a strong proponent of Sabermetrics
 Jack McGee as Buck Garland, a Padres coach who is Luongo's right-hand man
 Christian Ochoa as Livan Duarte, the Padres' backup catcher and Lawson's heir-apparent, who is a recent immigrant from Cuba
 JoAnna Garcia Swisher as Rachel Patrick, a sports newscaster and Mike's ex-wife
 Sarah Shahi as Natalie Luongo, Al's daughter who is also dating Oscar

Episodes

Production

Development
A pilot was sold on September 8, 2015, by series creators Dan Fogelman and Rick Singer. On January 14, 2016, Fox ordered the pilot to be shot. The creators opened up a casting call on February 24, 2016. The pilot episode was picked up to series on May 10, 2016. Major League Baseball cooperated in the production of the series.

Filming
The series was filmed in San Diego, California, and features the Padres, the club the protagonist plays for. Producers also planned to use Petco Park in downtown San Diego to shoot scenes when the Padres are away or during the off season.

Casting
On January 14, 2016, Kylie Bunbury was cast as Ginny. On February 11, 2016, Mark-Paul Gosselaar was cast as Mike Lawson. On February 23, 2016, Mo McRae, Meagan Holder, and Tim Jo were cast as Blip, Evelyne, and Eliot respectively. On February 29, 2016, Dan Lauria was cast as Al Luongo. On March 10, 2016, Ali Larter replaced Elisabeth Shue as Amelia Slater. On May 10, 2016, Mark Consuelos was cast as Oscar Arguella, the team's general manager and president.

Reception 
Pitch received positive reviews from television critics, with Bunbury's performance receiving praise. The editors of TV Guide placed Pitch fourth among the top ten picks for the most anticipated new shows of the 2016–2017 season. Its review, from writer Liz Rafferty, stated, "Not since Friday Night Lights have we seen a 'sports' show that managed to deliver week after week, making viewers feel as invested in the characters' personal dramas as we were in the final scores of the games" and added that  "Pitch has the potential to pick up that torch." She also had high praise for Bunbury, whom she cited as a "breakout star, not to mention her (fictional) character Ginny Baker, the first woman to pitch in the MLB, to be a role model for young female athletes everywhere". Based on 27 reviews, the show holds a 93% on Rotten Tomatoes, with Critics Consensus being "A terrific lead performance and well-constructed setup and timely themes make Pitch a home run."

Home media

See also
 Women in baseball

References

External links

 

2010s American drama television series
2016 American television series debuts
2016 American television series endings
American sports television series
Major League Baseball on television
Baseball television series
English-language television shows
Fox Broadcasting Company original programming
San Diego Padres
Serial drama television series
Television series by 20th Century Fox Television
Television shows set in San Diego
Television series created by Dan Fogelman